Urban Art is an artistic duo active in Germany and Poland. 
Its founders, Marek Pisarsky (born in 1956 in Ruda Śląska, Poland) and Anne Peschken (born in 1966 in Montreal, Quebec, Canada) have collaborated since 1988 on various artistic and curatorial projects.

Work
Dialog Loci, 2004
Dialog of Things, 2001

Bibliography
bucharest-buchawork
urbanart-berlin.de

German artists
Polish artist groups and collectives
German contemporary artists